Medicago is a genus of flowering plants in the bean family Fabaceae.

Medicago may also refer to:

Medicago Inc., a Canadian biotechnology company, currently developing a COVID-19 vaccine
Alfalfa (Medicago sativa; cavalry clover) sometimes called just "medicago"

See also

 Muricopsis medicago, a sea snail